Pseudotuerta is a monotypic genus of moths of the family Noctuidae erected by Sergius G. Kiriakoff in 1977. Its only species, Pseudotuerta argyrochlora, was first described by Robert Herbert Carcasson in 1964. It is found in the Democratic Republic of the Congo, Rwanda and Uganda.

References

Agaristinae
Monotypic moth genera